Black Sun is the third studio album from the alternative metal band Ra, released on September 23, 2008. "Broken Hearted Soul" was released as a single on Christmas Day 2007, later becoming available on iTunes on June 17, 2008. Black Sun was released to iTunes on September 16, 2008. Some retailers did not carry this album due to distribution problems (unverified).

The album reached #193 on the Billboard 200. It also reached #2 on Heatseekers Albums, and #30 on Independent Albums. Black Sun has sold more than 20,000 copies, while its single "Broken Hearted Soul" has sold more than 18,000.

Background

"'Raw' is actually released with no contract but the band gives Cement shoes the benefit of the doubt. 14 months later there is neither a contract nor is there a follow up studio album. Most fans had already figured that that band has broken up and that the new record would never see the light of day but Sahaj has never been one to let anyone hold him or Ra back. With his own money and the money of independent promoter Elizabeth Hodges, Sahaj opens Sahaja Music Records or SMR, going back to his friends at Universal to make an exclusive distribution deal."

Production

Title origin

"Black Sun is going to be… I’m naming it that specifically because the first record was From One, the second record was Duality and there are kind of spiritual connotations in all of that. I think this record is going to have the same level of spirituality but it’s going to be darker and that’s why we’re calling it Black Sun." - Sahaj

Recording

During the writing/recording process, Sahaj had to go through surgery to repair a ruptured disc in his back. Due to his obvious physical discomfort, Sahaj admitted to rushing the creation of the album. PJ Farley said, "It was a unique process because, this was the first time that we actually just got in a room and jammed and just hashed out material and would just hit record and play for hours".

Track listing
All songs by Sahaj Ticotin, except for where noted.

Album chart positions

Credits
Andy Ryan - drums
Sahaj Ticotin - guitar, vox, keyboards, producer 
PJ Farley - bass
Ben Carroll - guitar, programming

References

2008 albums
Ra (American band) albums
Experimental rock albums by American artists